The 1979–80 Inter-City League season was the second season of the Inter-City League, the top level ice hockey league in southern England. Nine teams participated in the league, and the Richmond Flyers won the championship. The games played by the Universities of Cambridge and Oxford were counted double. (One win/loss is equivalent to two wins/losses.)

Regular season

Playoffs

Final
Southampton Vikings - Richmond Flyers 6:10

External links
 Season on hockeyarchives.info

Inter
Inter-City League seasons